The 2014 Calgary Stampeders season was the 57th season for the team in the Canadian Football League and their 80th overall. The Stampeders finished first in the West Division for the second straight season for the first time since the 1996 season. The Stampeders also finished the season with a 15–3 record, tying a team record previously achieved during the 1995 season (and has since been surpassed in 2016 with a 15–2–1 record). With a win in Week 15 the Stampeders qualified for the playoffs for the 10th straight season. On November 30, 2014, the Stampeders won their seventh Grey Cup championship 20–16 over the Hamilton Tiger-Cats at BC Place in Vancouver.

Offseason

CFL draft
The 2014 CFL Draft took place on May 13, 2014. The Stampeders had the most picks in the draft, including trading for the first overall pick in the draft and the rights to Marwan Hage for Jon Gott. Overall, the club had nine selections in the seven-round draft, with two first-round and three third-round picks.

Preseason

Regular season

Standings

Schedule

Post season
With a win in week 15, the Stampeders qualified for the playoffs for the 10th straight season. The team was the first in the CFL to clinch a playoff spot, doing so with four games remaining in the regular season. Following their week 17 win over Winnipeg, the Stampeders clinched first place in the West Division with three games remaining.

Schedule

Team

Roster

Coaching staff

References

Calgary Stampeders seasons
2014 Canadian Football League season by team
Grey Cup championship seasons
Calgary Stampeders